R-1 regional road is a Montenegrin roadway.

Between Čekanje and Njeguši there use to be 7 hairpin turns, but after the tunnel was excavated in 2018, only 3 are still on this route. After Krstac, going down the western mountainside of Lovćen towards Kotor, there are additional 25 hairpin turns.

History
Section of the R-1 regional road between Cetinje and Krstac (Njeguši) is the oldest vehicular road in Montenegro. It was built after Montenegro was recognised as independent state at Congress of Berlin in 1878. Construction begin in 1879, and was finished in 1881 

Reconstruction of the road between Bajice (village at outskirts of Cetinje) and Krstac was reconstructed in 2017 and 2018. Road was widened from 4 meters to 6.6 meters and radius of curves increased. Between Čekanje and Njeguši a 490 meters tunnel was excavated, bypassing hairpin turns. All of this shortened the road for 3.5 km and at the same time increased the speed.

Major intersections

References

R-1